Major Charles Herbert Mullins VC CMG (28 June 1869 – 24 May 1916) was a South African recipient of the Victoria Cross, the highest and most prestigious award for gallantry in the face of the enemy that can be awarded to British and Commonwealth forces.

Details

Mullins was 30 years old, and a captain in the Imperial Light Horse (Natal) during the Second Boer War when the following deed took place at the Battle of Elandslaagte for which he and Captain Robert Johnston were awarded the VC.

Mullins returned to the United Kingdom and received the VC from King Edward VII during an investiture at Marlborough House 25 July 1901.

He later achieved the rank of major.

The medal was held by St. Andrew's College, Grahamstown, South Africa.  It was later returned to the family and is now on loan to the Imperial War Museum, London.

Clarles was the son of the Revd Canon Robert John Mullins, and brother to Robert George Mullins, the founder of St. Andrew's Preparatory School in Grahamstown.

See also 

Monuments to Courage
The Register of the Victoria Cross
Victoria Crosses of the Anglo-Boer War

References

Further reading

 

Second Boer War recipients of the Victoria Cross
South African recipients of the Victoria Cross
1869 births
1916 deaths
Alumni of St. Andrew's College, Grahamstown
South African Companions of the Order of St Michael and St George
Alumni of Keble College, Oxford
Members of the Inner Temple
Imperial Light Horse officers
People from Makhanda, Eastern Cape